In quantum mechanics, Landau quantization refers to the quantization of the cyclotron orbits of charged particles in a uniform magnetic field.  As a result, the charged particles can only occupy orbits with discrete, equidistant energy values, called Landau levels. These levels are degenerate, with the number of electrons per level directly proportional to the strength of the applied magnetic field. It is named after the Soviet physicist Lev Landau.

Landau quantization is directly responsible for the electronic susceptibility of metals, known as Landau diamagnetism. Under strong magnetic fields, Landau quantization leads to oscillations in electronic properties of materials as a function of the applied magnetic field known as De Haas–Van Alphen and Shubnikov–de Haas effects.

Landau quantization is a key ingredient to explain the integer quantum Hall effect.

Derivation 

Consider a system of non-interacting particles with charge  and spin  confined to an area  in the  plane. Apply a uniform magnetic field  along the -axis.  In SI units, the Hamiltonian of this system (here, the effects of spin are neglected) is

The vector potential is related to the magnetic field by  

There is some gauge freedom in the choice of vector potential for a given magnetic field. The Hamiltonian is gauge invariant, which means that adding the gradient of a scalar field to  changes the overall phase of the wave function by an amount corresponding to the scalar field. But physical properties are not influenced by the specific choice of gauge.

In the Landau gauge 
From the possible solutions for A, a gauge fixing introduced by Lev Landau is often used for charged particles in a constant magnetic field. 

When  then   is a possible solution in the Landau gauge.  

In this gauge, the Hamiltonian is

The operator  commutes with this Hamiltonian, since the operator  is absent by the choice of gauge.  Thus the operator  can be replaced by its eigenvalue . Since  does not appear in the Hamiltonian and only the z-momentum appears in the kinetic energy, this motion along the z-direction is a free motion. 

To find the energies, note that translating the harmonic oscillator potential does not affect the energies.  The energies of this system are thus identical to those of the standard quantum harmonic oscillator,

The energy does not depend on the quantum number , so there will be a finite number of degeneracies (If the particle is placed in an unconfined space, this degeneracy will correspond to a continuous sequence of ).

For the wave functions, recall that  commutes with the Hamiltonian.  Then the wave function factors into a product of momentum eigenstates in the  direction and harmonic oscillator eigenstates  shifted by an amount 0 in the  direction:

where .

In the symmetric gauge
The derivation treated  and y as asymmetric. However, by the symmetry of the system, there is no physical quantity which distinguishes these coordinates.

A more adequate choice of gauge, is the symmetric gauge, which refers to the choice

In terms of dimensionless lengths and energies, the Hamiltonian can be expressed as

Consider operators

These operators follow certain commutation relations

In terms of above operators the Hamiltonian can be written as

where we reintroduced the units back.

The Landau level index  is the eigenvalue of the operator .

The application of  increases  by one unit while preserving , whereas  application simultaneously increase  and decreases  by one unit. The analogy to quantum harmonic oscillator provides solutions

where

and

One may verify that the above states correspond to choosing wavefunctions proportional to

where .

In particular, the lowest Landau level  consists of arbitrary analytic functions multiplying a Gaussian, .

Degeneracy of the Landau levels

In the Landau gauge 
The effects of Landau levels may only be observed when the mean thermal energy  is smaller than the energy level separation, meaning low temperatures and strong magnetic fields.

Each Landau level is degenerate because of the second quantum number , which can take the values 

where  is an integer.

For particles with charge , the upper bound on  can be simply written as a ratio of fluxes,

Thus, for particles with spin , the maximum number  of particles per Landau level is

which for electrons (where  and ) gives , two available states for each flux quantum that penetrates the system.

The above gives only a rough idea of the effects of finite-size geometry. Strictly speaking, using the standard solution of the harmonic oscillator is only valid for systems unbounded in the -direction (infinite strips). If the size  is finite, boundary conditions in that direction give rise to non-standard quantization conditions on the magnetic field, involving (in principle) both solutions to the Hermite equation. The filling of these levels with many electrons is still an active area of research.

In general, Landau levels are observed in electronic systems.  As the magnetic field is increased, more and more electrons can fit into a given Landau level.  The occupation of the highest Landau level ranges from completely full to entirely empty, leading to oscillations in various electronic properties (see De Haas–Van Alphen effect and Shubnikov–de Haas effect).

If Zeeman splitting is included, each Landau level splits into a pair, one for spin up electrons and the other for spin down electrons.  Then the occupation of each spin Landau level is just the ratio of fluxes .  Zeeman splitting has a significant effect on the Landau levels because their energy scales are the same, . However, the Fermi energy and ground state energy stay roughly the same in a system with many filled levels, since pairs of split energy levels cancel each other out when summed.

Moreover, the above derivation in the Landau gauge assumed an electron confined in the -direction, which is a relevant experimental situation — found in two-dimensional electron gases, for instance. Still, this assumption is not essential for the results. If electrons are free to move along the  direction, the wave function acquires an additional multiplicative term ; the energy corresponding to this free motion, is added to the  discussed. This term then fills in the separation in energy of the different Landau levels, blurring the effect of the quantization. Nevertheless, the motion in the --plane, perpendicular to the magnetic field, is still quantized.

In the symmetric gauge 
Each Landau level has degenerate orbitals labeled by the quantum numbers  in symmetric gauge. The degeneracy per unit area is the same in each Landau level.

The z component of angular momentum is

However, it may be arbitrarily large, which is necessary to obtain the infinite degeneracy (or finite degeneracy per unit area) exhibited by the system.

Relativistic case 

An electron following Dirac equation under a constant magnetic field, can be analytically solved. The energies are given by

where c is the speed of light, the sign depends on the particle-antiparticle component and ν is a non-negative integer.

The massless 2D case can be simulated in single-layer materials like graphene near the Dirac cones, where the eigenergies are given by 

where the speed of light has to be replaced with the Fermi speed vF of the material and the minus sign corresponds to electron holes.

Magnetic susceptibility of a Fermi gas
The Fermi gas (an ensemble of non-interacting fermions) is part of the basis for understanding of the thermodynamic properties of metals. In 1930 Landau derived an estimate for the magnetic susceptibility of a Fermi gas, known as Landau susceptibility, which is constant for small magnetic fields. Landau also noticed that the susceptibility oscillates with high frequency for large magnetic fields, this physical phenomenon is known as the De Haas–Van Alphen effect.

Two-dimensional lattice 

The tight binding energy spectrum of charged particles in a two dimensional infinite lattice is known to be self-similar and fractal, as demonstrated in Hofstadter's butterfly. For an integer ratio of the magnetic flux quantum and the magnetic flux through a lattice cell, one recovers the Landau levels for large integers.

Integer quantum Hall effect

See also
Barkhausen effect
Laughlin wavefunction
Static forces and virtual-particle exchange

External link

References

Further reading
 Landau, L. D.; and Lifschitz, E. M.; (1977). Quantum Mechanics: Non-relativistic Theory. Course of Theoretical Physics. Vol. 3 (3rd ed. London: Pergamon Press). .

Quantum mechanics
Electric and magnetic fields in matter
Lev Landau